Brian Lyons is an Irish former hurler who played as a midfielder for the Offaly senior team.

Born in Banagher, County Offaly, Lyons first played competitive hurling in his youth. He made his senior debut with Offaly during the 1971-72 National League and immediately became a regular member of the team. During his brief career he experienced little success.

At club level Lyons is a two-time Leinster medallist with St Rynagh's. He also won numerous championship medals with the club.

Honours
St Rynagh's
Leinster Senior Club Hurling Championship (2): 1970, 1972

References

Living people
St Rynagh's hurlers
Offaly inter-county hurlers
Year of birth missing (living people)